Michel Siffre (born 3 January 1939) is a French underground explorer, adventurer and scientist. He was born in Nice, where he spent his childhood. At just 10 years of age, he explored the Imperial Cave Park, and discovered a passion for caving.

He received a postgraduate degree at the Sorbonne six months after completing his baccalauréat.  His many achievements include the creation of the French Institute of Speleology in 1962.

Main achievements 
 In his youth, he became interested in the space race and decided to find a way to contribute. Imagining situations faced by astronauts, he noticed that some of them could play out in a deep cave. This motivated him to start his experiments.
 The experience of time, two months cloistered in the abyss of Scarasson (Punta Marguareis) without time cues on a glacier, from July 1962. He then organized several similar underground experiments for other speleologists. In 1972, Siffre went back underground for a six-month stay in a cave in Texas. He found that without time cues, several people including himself adjusted to a 48-hour rather than a 24-hour cycle.
 The notes of his experiments were used by NASA. Several astronauts reported experiences similar to those experienced in underground experiments such as loss of short-term memory to being isolated from external time references.

Publications 
 Hors du temps. L'expérience du 16 juillet 1962 au fond du gouffre de Scarasson par celui qui l'a vécue, Julliard, 1963
 Des merveilles sous la terre, Hachette, cop. 1976
 Stalactites, stalagmites, cop. 1984
 L'or des gouffres: découvertes dans les jungles mayas, Flammarion, 1979
 Dans les abîmes de la terre, Flammarion, 1975
 La France des grottes et cavernes, Privat, 1999
 A la recherche de l'art des cavernes du pays Maya, A. Lefeuvre, 1979
 Découvertes dans les grottes mayas, Arthaud, 1993
 Beyond Time, Translated by Herma Briffault, McGraw-Hill, New York, 1964

Notes and references

See also 
 Chronobiology
 Circadian rhythm
 Maurizio Montalbini

Bibliography 
 Schut, Une histoire culturelle de la spéléologie, L’Harmattan.

French speleologists
Chronobiologists
University of Paris alumni
1939 births
Living people